Douglas Andrew John Bracewell (born 28 September 1990) is an international New Zealand cricketer who currently plays for Central Districts. He is a right-handed batsman and bowls right-arm fast-medium pace. He is the son of former Test cricketer Brendon Bracewell. His uncle is also a former Black Caps player and coach John Bracewell.

Early days
Born in Tauranga, Bracewell was educated at Rathkeale College near Masterton.

Domestic career
In 2008, Bracewell was selected in the New Zealand under-19 squad for their tour of England, he played both ‘Tests’ and five ‘ODIs’.

On 17 November 2008 he made his first-class cricket debut for Central Districts against Auckland, he was dismissed for a duck in the first innings before taking 1 wicket for 41 runs (1/41). A month later he made his List A debut against the same opposition, he took 2/33 and as opening batsman scored 55.

After a very successful end of 2011 and early 2012, Bracewell was drafted by Delhi Daredevils in the 2012 IPL draft.

In June 2018, he was awarded a contract with Central Districts for the 2018–19 season.

International career
Bracewell made his Test debut against Zimbabwe in November 2011, and took 5/85 in the second innings. Bracewell became the seventh New Zealand bowler to pick up a five-wicket haul on Test debut. It is also the fifth five-wicket haul by a bowler making his debut against Zimbabwe.

In a Test match against Australia at Bellerive Oval, Hobart Bracewell ran through the Australian batting line-up and took figures of 6/40 in only his third Test, the best bowling by a New Zealander in Tests in nearly 5 years. He bowled Nathan Lyon to seal the win by 7 runs. It was also 26 years since New Zealand last won a Test match in Australia.

Having not played internationally since October 2016 due to injuries and drink-driving charges, he was picked for the first match of the ODI series against West Indies as Colin de Grandhomme returned to Zimbabwe on family bereavement leave. In the first ODI against West Indies, he took 4 wickets in that match by restricting them below 250. New Zealand finally won that match by 5 wickets and Bracewell was awarded man of the match for his match winning performance.

See also
 List of New Zealand cricketers who have taken five-wicket hauls on Test debut

References

External links

1990 births
Living people
New Zealand cricketers
New Zealand Māori sportspeople
New Zealand Test cricketers
New Zealand One Day International cricketers
New Zealand Twenty20 International cricketers
Central Districts cricketers
Sportspeople from Tauranga
Cricketers who have taken five wickets on Test debut
Delhi Capitals cricketers
People educated at Rathkeale College
Northamptonshire cricketers
Doug